Guido Cantelli (27 April 192024 November 1956) was an Italian orchestral conductor. Toscanini elected him his "spiritual heir" since the beginnings of his career. He was named Musical Director of La Scala, Milan in November 1956, but his promising career was cut short only one week later by his death at the age of 36 in an airplane crash in Paris, France.

Biography

Early years
Cantelli was born on 27 April 1920 in Novara, Italy, to Antonio and Angela (née Riccardone). He started studying music while still very young. From 1939 until 1941 he studied with Arrigo Pedrollo, and then, from 1941 until 1942, with Giorgio Federico Ghedini and Antonino Votto. In 1940 he started his conducting career, graduating from the Milan Conservatory in 1943.

Career
Cantelli studied at the Milan Conservatory and began a promising conducting career. In 1943, he garnered acclaim for a representation of the Traviata at the Teatro Coccia. Beside being the conductor, Cantelli was also the artistic director of the representation.

Cantelli's career was interrupted by World War II, during which he was forced to serve in the Italian army, then placed in a German labor camp because of his outspoken opposition to the Nazis. He was sent with a team of laborers to Frankfurt am Main. While in Germany, Cantelli was interned in a concentration camp in Szczecin. He fell ill and managed to escape the camp. Cantelli was repatriated to Italy in 1944, establishing himself in Turin. He resumed his musical career after the Allies liberated Italy.

After resuming his musical career in Turin, Cantelli was invited to conduct some concerts with the Symphony Orchestra of the Radio of Milan (Orchestra sinfonica della Radio di Milano). Riccardo Pick-Mangiagalli, the director of the Milan Conservatory, decided it was the moment to present the young conductor to the wide public, organizing a concert at the Rocchetta Court of the Castello Sforzesco on 27 July 1945, entrusting to Cantelli the Orchestra of La Scala. The programme was very proving, and included, among other things, Pyotr Ilyich Tchaikovsky's Symphony No. 6, or Pathétique Symphony. The performance immediately signaled Cantelli's "innate elegance of the gesture, the interpretative strength and stylistic purity, which, animated by the youthful momentum of the young conductor, made a great impression on the public."

After the success of the Castello Sforzesco's concert, a successful international career started for Cantelli. This career would bring him on the major stages of the world, where he would conduct the world's most famous orchestras. He was acclaimed by the public and the critics alike. However, in spite of all the compliments and the success, Cantelli's attention was not diverted from his studies. He kept on studying with "scrupulous commitment and professionalism," encouraged by the great Arturo Toscanini. Toscanini saw him conduct at La Scala, Milan, and remained impressed. The results of these stylistic studies by Cantelli maturated on 21 May 1948, with a concert that, in a way, "marked his definitive Scaliger consecration and at the same time his authoritative entry into the small number of great international conductors." Toscanini invited him to guest conduct the NBC Symphony Orchestra in 1949. In a note written to Cantelli's wife Iris in 1950 after four of these concerts, Toscanini said:

I am happy and moved to inform you of Guido's great success and that I introduced him to my orchestra, which loves him as I do. This is the first time in my long career that I have met a young man so gifted. He will go far, very far.

He had debuted in America on 15 January 1949, with a "most positive encounter with the New Yorker public." On 3 January 1952 he was welcomed again by the American public, conducting the New York Philharmonic. Between these two dates, he had been welcomed in Edinburgh (1950), and had completed an acclaimed tournée in London.

Cantelli, who had started his career very young in 1940, was already  performing in the greatest theaters in Europe and America by 1945. In the course of his brief career, he had conducted not only in many of the most famous concert halls of Europe but also in the United States and South Africa. Besides conducting the NBC Symphony from 1949 to 1954, Cantelli also guest conducted the New York Philharmonic and the Boston Symphony Orchestra in the U.S. and the Philharmonia Orchestra in the UK.

While he was conducting in America and Europe and garnering acclaim therein, Cantelli "also continued his triumphal career in his homeland." After dedicating himself for a long time to symphonic music, Cantelli wanted to return to the "lyric repertoire." The result of such decision was a memorable Così fan tutte conducted by Cantelli at the Piccola Scala on 27 January 1956. Cantelli, beside conducting, was also the director of the opera, the cast of which included such prominent names as Elisabeth Schwarzkopf and Graziella Sciutti. The opera had a triumphal outcome, and it nothing but confirmed Cantelli's "exceptional directorial abilities." The opera was repeated in Johannesburg, where it came to an "equally sensational success."

He was named Musical Director of La Scala on 16 November 1956. Cantelli was called in the United States to conduct a series of concerts with the New York Philharmonic Orchestra, but tragedy struck. He died in the crash of LAI Flight 451 at Orly Airport in Paris, France only a week after he was named director of La Scala, on 24 November. He was 36 years old. Toscanini, who was in failing health and died less than two months later, was not informed of Cantelli's death.

At the time of his death, Cantelli was being considered as the next music director of the New York Philharmonic, as successor to Dimitri Mitropoulos; instead, Leonard Bernstein (who also guest conducted the NBC Symphony) was appointed conductor of the Philharmonic in 1958.

Toscanini had elected Cantelli his "spiritual heir" since the beginning of his career. A "sensible and refined artist," Cantelli is remembered as a "living presence in the Italian music world," especially as an "admirable example of professional seriousness, whose artistic commitment was constantly aimed at achieving a severe and unquenchable stylistic perfection." Cantelli had a strong will, and characterial endowments that enhanced his communicative skills and magnetism. He had a wide repertory, that he always conducted from memory even during rehearsals. He performed "a very rigorous systematic analysis, noting the salient phrases of each composition in the margins of each score, also specifying rhythmic characteristics and interpretative aspects."

Massimo Mila stated that for Cantelli "conducting was a peremptory and absolute vocation, an inexorable determination," which allowed him, in a short time, to size "the most recondite secrets of the art of conducting, and to reach a surprising artistic maturity very soon." He studied with the greatest, learning their secrets and benefiting from their experience, yet never imitating anyone, "manifesting without hesitation his artistic personality," entering, in each execution, in an "almost supernatural state that isolated him from the surrounding world."

Cantelli had been made "one of the most representative figures in the contemporary directorial panorama" by the aforementioned gifts along with, among other things, his communicative skills with the orchestra and the public, the natural "limpidity" of his gesture, his magnetism, and his interpretative versatility. It is not a case that he was considered the living heir of Toscanini.

Performances and recordings
Cantelli left a small legacy of commercial and live recordings. Among these are recordings of Beethoven's 7th symphony (ASD 254) and 5th piano concerto (with Walter Gieseking and the New York Philharmonic Orchestra in Carnegie Hall from 25 March 1956), Symphony No. 29 (Mozart) on HMV's ALP 1461, Schubert's 8th symphony (ALP 1325), Brahms' 1st (ALP 1152) and 3rd symphonies (BLP 1083), Franck's D minor symphony (ALP 1219 mono issue) (with the NBC Symphony in Carnegie Hall in stereo from 6 April 1954), Mussorgsky's Pictures at an Exhibition, Paul Hindemith's Symphony: Mathis der Maler, Liszt's 2nd piano concerto with Claudio Arrau, and shorter pieces by Ravel (ALP 1207), Rossini, and others. He recorded Vivaldi's The Four Seasons with the New York Philharmonic for Columbia Records. He recorded a fine performance of Tchaikovsky’s Pathetique Symphony with The Philharmonia Orchestra [HMV]

His one surviving opera performance is of Così fan tutte, from La Scala in 1956. There is also a live recording of the Verdi Requiem (with Herva Nelli). He conducted the Mozart Requiem at La Scala in 1950. There are live recordings with the New York Philharmonic of Beethoven's first and fifth piano concertos, with Rudolf Serkin as soloist, from 1953 and 1954, respectively.

The Franck, Brahms 3rd, Schubert 8th, and Beethoven 7th symphonies were among his few stereo recordings. Just before his death, Cantelli recorded the final three movements of Beethoven's Symphony No. 5 in stereo for EMI, but did not record the first movement, due to a construction project outside London's Kingsway Hall. In recent years, many performances from broadcasts and recording sessions with the NBC Symphony, from 1949 to 1954, have been made available.

There is a film clip of Cantelli conducting the final moments of Rossini's overture to Semiramide.

Personal life
Cantelli's wife was Iris Cantelli, née Bilucaglia, the daughter of a noted Istrian Italian pediatrician and obstetrician, who had to leave his native land in the Istrian-Dalmatian exodus. They had a son together, Leonardo, who was but 5 months old at the time of his father's death.

References

External links
Database of all Guido Cantelli recordings
Brief biography

1920 births
1956 deaths
Italian male conductors (music)
Victims of aviation accidents or incidents in France
Victims of aviation accidents or incidents in 1956
20th-century Italian conductors (music)
Milan Conservatory alumni
Italian military personnel of World War II
People from Novara
20th-century Italian male musicians
Music & Arts artists
Italian escapees
Escapees from German detention